Spumatoria is a fungal genus in the family Ophiostomataceae. This is a monotypic genus, containing the single species Spumatoria longicollis.

References

External links

Ophiostomatales
Monotypic Sordariomycetes genera